The Boran cisticola (Cisticola bodessa) is a species of bird in the family Cisticolidae.
It is found in Ethiopia, Kenya and Uganda.
Its natural habitats are subtropical or tropical dry forest, dry savanna, and subtropical or tropical dry shrubland.

References

Boran cisticola
Birds of the Horn of Africa
Boran cisticola
Boran cisticola
Taxonomy articles created by Polbot